The Convention on Biological Diversity (CBD), known informally as the Biodiversity Convention, is a multilateral treaty. The Convention has three main goals: the conservation of biological diversity (or biodiversity); the sustainable use of its components; and the fair and equitable sharing of benefits arising from genetic resources. Its objective is to develop national strategies for the conservation and sustainable use of biological diversity, and it is often seen as the key document regarding sustainable development.

The Convention was opened for signature at the Earth Summit in Rio de Janeiro on 5 June 1992 and entered into force on 29 December 1993. The United States is the only UN member state which has not ratified the Convention. It has two supplementary agreements, the Cartagena Protocol and Nagoya Protocol.

The Cartagena Protocol on Biosafety to the Convention on Biological Diversity is an international treaty governing the movements of living modified organisms (LMOs) resulting from modern biotechnology from one country to another. It was adopted on 29 January 2000 as a supplementary agreement to the CBD and entered into force on 11 September 2003.

The Nagoya Protocol on Access to Genetic Resources and the Fair and Equitable Sharing of Benefits Arising from their Utilization (ABS) to the Convention on Biological Diversity is another supplementary agreement to the CBD. It provides a transparent legal framework for the effective implementation of one of the three objectives of the CBD: the fair and equitable sharing of benefits arising out of the utilization of genetic resources. The Nagoya Protocol was adopted on 29 October 2010 in Nagoya, Japan, and entered into force on 12 October 2014.

2010 was also the International Year of Biodiversity, and the Secretariat of the CBD was its focal point. Following a recommendation of CBD signatories at Nagoya, the UN declared 2011 to 2020 as the United Nations Decade on Biodiversity in December 2010. The Convention's Strategic Plan for Biodiversity 2011-2020, created in 2010, include the Aichi Biodiversity Targets.

The meetings of the Parties to the Convention are known as Conferences of the Parties (COP), with the first one (COP 1) held in Nassau, Bahamas, in 1994 and the most recent one (COP 15) in 2021/2022 in Kunming, China and Montreal, Canada.

In the area of marine and coastal biodiversity CBD's focus at present is to identify Ecologically or Biologically Significant Marine Areas (EBSAs) in specific ocean locations based on scientific criteria. The aim is to create an international legally binding instrument (ILBI) involving area-based planning and decision-making under UNCLOS to support the conservation and sustainable use of marine biological diversity beyond areas of national jurisdiction (BBNJ).

Origin and scope

The notion of an international convention on biodiversity was conceived at a United Nations Environment Programme (UNEP) Ad Hoc Working Group of Experts on Biological Diversity in November 1988. The subsequent year, the Ad Hoc Working Group of Technical and Legal Experts was established for the drafting of a legal text which addressed the conservation and sustainable use of biological diversity, as well as the sharing of benefits arising from their utilization with sovereign states and local communities.
In 1991, an intergovernmental negotiating committee was established, tasked with finalizing the Convention's text.

A Conference for the Adoption of the Agreed Text of the Convention on Biological Diversity was held in Nairobi, Kenya, in 1992, and its conclusions were distilled in the Nairobi Final Act. The Convention's text was opened for signature on 5 June 1992 at the United Nations Conference on Environment and Development (the Rio "Earth Summit"). By its closing date, 4 June 1993, the Convention had received 168 signatures. It entered into force on 29 December 1993.

The Convention recognized for the first time in international law that the conservation of biodiversity is "a common concern of humankind" and is an integral part of the development process. The agreement covers all ecosystems, species, and genetic resources. It links traditional conservation efforts to the economic goal of using biological resources sustainably. It sets principles for the fair and equitable sharing of the benefits arising from the use of genetic resources, notably those destined for commercial use. It also covers the rapidly expanding field of biotechnology through its Cartagena Protocol on Biosafety, addressing technology development and transfer, benefit-sharing and biosafety issues. Importantly, the Convention is legally binding; countries that join it ('Parties') are obliged to implement its provisions.

The Convention reminds decision-makers that natural resources are not infinite and sets out a philosophy of sustainable use. While past conservation efforts were aimed at protecting particular species and habitats, the Convention recognizes that ecosystems, species and genes must be used for the benefit of humans. However, this should be done in a way and at a rate that does not lead to the long-term decline of biological diversity.

The Convention also offers decision-makers guidance based on the precautionary principle which demands that where there is a threat of significant reduction or loss of biological diversity, lack of full scientific certainty should not be used as a reason for postponing measures to avoid or minimize such a threat. The Convention acknowledges that substantial investments are required to conserve biological diversity. It argues, however, that conservation will bring us significant environmental, economic and social benefits in return.

The Convention on Biological Diversity of 2010 banned some forms of geoengineering.

Executive secretary
As of 1 December 2019, the acting executive secretary is Elizabeth Maruma Mrema.

The previous executive secretaries were:
:pl:Cristiana Pașca Palmer (2017–2019), Braulio Ferreira de Souza Dias (2012–2017), Ahmed Djoghlaf (2006–2012), Hamdallah Zedan (1998–2005), Calestous Juma (1995–1998), and Angela Cropper (1993–1995).

Issues
Some of the many issues dealt with under the Convention include:

 Measures the incentives for the conservation and sustainable use of biological diversity.
 Regulated access to genetic resources and traditional knowledge, including Prior Informed Consent of the party providing resources.
 Sharing, in a fair and equitable way, the results of research and development and the benefits arising from the commercial and other utilization of genetic resources with the Contracting Party providing such resources (governments and/or local communities that provided the traditional knowledge or biodiversity resources utilized).
 Access to and transfer of technology, including biotechnology, to the governments and/or local communities that provided traditional knowledge and/or biodiversity resources.
 Technical and scientific cooperation.
 Coordination of a global directory of taxonomic expertise (Global Taxonomy Initiative).
 Impact assessment.
 Education and public awareness.
 Provision of financial resources.
 National reporting on efforts to implement treaty commitments.

International bodies established

Conference of the Parties (COP)
The Convention's governing body is the Conference of the Parties (COP), consisting of all governments (and regional economic integration organizations) that have ratified the treaty. This ultimate authority reviews progress under the Convention, identifies new priorities, and sets work plans for members. The COP can also make amendments to the Convention, create expert advisory bodies, review progress reports by member nations, and collaborate with other international organizations and agreements.

The Conference of the Parties uses expertise and support from several other bodies that are established by the Convention. In addition to committees or mechanisms established on an ad hoc basis, the main organs are:

CBD Secretariat
The CBD Secretariat, based in Montreal, Quebec, Canada, operates under UNEP, the United Nations Environment Programme. Its main functions are to organize meetings, draft documents, assist member governments in the implementation of the programme of work, coordinate with other international organizations, and collect and disseminate information.

Subsidiary Body for Scientific, Technical and Technological Advice (SBSTTA)
The SBSTTA is a committee composed of experts from member governments competent in relevant fields. It plays a key role in making recommendations to the COP on scientific and technical issues. It provides assessments of the status of biological diversity and of various measures taken in accordance with Convention, and also gives recommendations to the Conference of the Parties, which may be endorsed in whole, in part or in modified form by the COPs.  SBSTTA had met 23 times, with a 24th meeting taking place in Geneva, Switzerland in 2022.

Subsidiary Body on Implementation (SBI)
In 2014, the Conference of the Parties to the Convention on Biological Diversity established the Subsidiary Body on Implementation (SBI) to replace the Ad Hoc Open-ended Working Group on Review of Implementation of the Convention. The four functions and core areas of work of SBI are: (a) review of progress in implementation; (b) strategic actions to enhance implementation; (c) strengthening means of implementation; and (d) operations of the Convention and the Protocols. The first meeting of the SBI was held on 2–6 May 2016 and the second meeting was held on 9–13 July 2018, both in Montreal, Canada. The third meeting of the SBI will be held in March 2022 in Geneva, Switzerland. The Bureau of the Conference of the Parties serves as the Bureau of the SBI. The current chair of the SBI is Ms. Charlotta Sörqvist of Sweden.

Parties

As of 2016, the Convention has 196 Parties, which includes 195 states and the European Union. All UN member states—with the exception of the United States—have ratified the treaty. Non-UN member states that have ratified are the Cook Islands, Niue, and the State of Palestine. The Holy See and the states with limited recognition are non-Parties. The US has signed but not ratified the treaty, because ratification requires a two-thirds majority in the Senate and is blocked by Republican Party senators.

The European Union created the Cartagena Protocol (see below) in 2000 to enhance biosafety regulation and propagate the "precautionary principle" over the "sound science principle" defended by the United States. Whereas the impact of the Cartagena Protocol on domestic regulations has been substantial, its impact on international trade law remains uncertain. In 2006, the World Trade Organization (WTO) ruled that the European Union had violated international trade law between 1999 and 2003 by imposing a moratorium on the approval of genetically modified organisms (GMO) imports. Disappointing the United States, the panel nevertheless "decided not to decide" by not invalidating the stringent European biosafety regulations.

Implementation by the Parties to the Convention is achieved using two means:

National Biodiversity Strategies and Action Plans (NBSAP)
National Biodiversity Strategies and Action Plans (NBSAP) are the principal instruments for implementing the Convention at the national level. The Convention requires that countries prepare a national biodiversity strategy and to ensure that this strategy is included in planning for activities in all sectors where diversity may be impacted. As of early 2012, 173 Parties had developed NBSAPs.

The United Kingdom, New Zealand and Tanzania carried out elaborate responses to conserve individual species and specific habitats. The United States of America, a signatory who had not yet ratified the treaty by 2010, produced one of the most thorough implementation programs through species recovery programs and other mechanisms long in place in the US for species conservation.

Singapore established a detailed National Biodiversity Strategy and Action Plan. The National Biodiversity Centre of Singapore represents Singapore in the Convention for Biological Diversity.

National Reports
In accordance with Article 26 of the Convention, Parties prepare national reports on the status of implementation of the Convention.

Protocols and plans developed by CBD

Cartagena Protocol (2000)

The Cartagena Protocol on Biosafety, also known as the Biosafety Protocol, was adopted in January 2000, after a CBD Open-ended Ad Hoc Working Group on Biosafety had met six times between July 1996 and February 1999. The Working Group submitted a draft text of the Protocol for consideration by Conference of the Parties at its first extraordinary meeting, which was convened for the express purpose of adopting a protocol on biosafety to the Convention on Biological Diversity. After a few delays, the Cartagena Protocol was eventually adopted on 29 January 2000. The Biosafety Protocol seeks to protect biological diversity from the potential risks posed by living modified organisms resulting from modern biotechnology.

The Biosafety Protocol makes clear that products from new technologies must be based on the precautionary principle and allow developing nations to balance public health against economic benefits. It will, for example, let countries ban imports of a genetically modified organism if they feel there is not enough scientific evidence the product is safe and requires exporters to label shipments containing genetically modified commodities such as corn or cotton.

The required number of 50 instruments of ratification/accession/approval/acceptance by countries was reached in May 2003. In accordance with the provisions of its Article 37, the Protocol entered into force on 11 September 2003.

Global Strategy for Plant Conservation (2002) 

In April 2002, the Parties of the UN CBD adopted the recommendations of the Gran Canaria Declaration Calling for a Global Plant Conservation Strategy, and adopted a 16-point plan aiming to slow the rate of plant extinctions around the world by 2010.

Nagoya Protocol (2010)

The Nagoya Protocol on Access to Genetic Resources and the Fair and Equitable Sharing of Benefits Arising from their Utilization to the Convention on Biological Diversity was adopted on 29 October 2010 in Nagoya, Aichi Prefecture, Japan, at the tenth meeting of the Conference of the Parties, and entered into force on 12 October 2014. The protocol is a supplementary agreement to the Convention on Biological Diversity, and provides a transparent legal framework for the effective implementation of one of the three objectives of the CBD: the fair and equitable sharing of benefits arising out of the utilization of genetic resources. It thereby contributes to the conservation and sustainable use of biodiversity.

Strategic Plan for Biodiversity 2011-2020
Also at the tenth meeting of the Conference of the Parties, held from 18 to 29 October 2010 in Nagoya, a revised and updated "Strategic Plan for Biodiversity, 2011-2020" was agreed and published. This document included the "Aichi Biodiversity Targets", comprising 20 targets that address each of five strategic goals defined in the plan. The strategic plan includes the following strategic goals:
 Strategic Goal A: Address the underlying causes of biodiversity loss by mainstreaming biodiversity across government and society
 Strategic Goal B: Reduce the direct pressures on biodiversity and promote sustainable use
 Strategic Goal C: To improve the status of biodiversity by safeguarding ecosystems, species and genetic diversity
 Strategic Goal D: Enhance the benefits to all from biodiversity and ecosystem services
 Strategic Goal E: Enhance implementation through participatory planning, knowledge management and capacity building
Upon the launch of Agenda 2030, CBD released a technical note mapping and identifying synergies between the 17 Sustainable Development Goals (SDGs) and the 20 Aichi Biodiversity Targets. This helps to understand the contributions of biodiversity to achieving the SDGs.

post-2020 Global Biodiversity Framework 

A new plan, known as the post-2020 Global Biodiversity Framework (GBF), is being developed to guide action through 2030. A first draft of this framework was released in July 2021, and its final content is being discussed and negotiated as part of the ongoing COP 15 meetings. The draft framework includes a number of ambitious goals, including a commitment to designate at least 30 percent of global land and sea as protected areas (known as the "30 by 30" initiative). Reducing agricultural pollution and sharing the benefits of digital sequence information have arisen as key points of contention among Parties. A final draft was submitted to the Convention December 5, 2022.

Marine and coastal biodiversity 
The CBD has a significant focus on marine and coastal biodiversity. A series of expert workshops have been held (2018–2022) to identify options for modifying the description of Ecologically or Biologically Significant Marine Areas (EBSAs) and describing new areas. These have focused on the North-East, North-West and South-Eastern Atlantic Ocean, Baltic Sea, Caspian Sea, Black Sea, Seas of East Asia, North-West Indian Ocean and Adjacent Gulf Areas, Southern and North-East Indian Ocean, Mediterranean Sea, North and South Pacific, Eastern Tropical and Temperate Pacific, Wider Caribbean and Western Mid-Atlantic. The workshop meetings have followed the EBSA process based on internationally agreed scientific criteria. This is aimed at creating an international legally binding instrument (ILBI) under UNCLOS to support the conservation and sustainable use of marine biological diversity beyond areas of national jurisdiction (BBNJ). The central mechanism is area-based planning and decision-making. It integrates EBSAs, Vulnerable Marine Ecosystems (VMEs) and High Seas (Marine Protected Areas) with Blue Growth scenarios. There is also linkage with the EU Marine Strategy Framework Directive.

Criticism
There have been criticisms against CBD that its implementation has been weakened due to resistance of Western countries to the implementation of pro-South provisions of the Convention. CBD is also regarded as a case of a hard treaty gone soft in the implementation trajectory. The argument to enforce the treaty as a legally binding multilateral instrument with the Conference of Parties reviewing the infractions and non-compliance is also gaining strength.

Although the Convention explicitly states that all forms of life are covered by its provisions, examination of reports and of national biodiversity strategies and action plans submitted by participating countries shows that in practice this is not happening. The fifth report of the European Union, for example, makes frequent reference to animals (particularly fish) and plants, but does not mention bacteria, fungi or protists at all. The International Society for Fungal Conservation has assessed more than 100 of these CBD documents for their coverage of fungi using defined criteria to place each in one of six categories. No documents were assessed as good or adequate, less than 10% as nearly adequate or poor, and the rest as deficient, seriously deficient or totally deficient.

Scientists working with biodiversity and medical research are expressing fears that the Nagoya Protocol is counterproductive, and will hamper disease prevention and conservation efforts, and that the threat of imprisonment of scientists will have a chilling effect on research. Non-commercial researchers and institutions such as natural history museums fear maintaining biological reference collections and exchanging material between institutions will become difficult, and medical researchers have expressed alarm at plans to expand the protocol to make it illegal to publicly share genetic information, e.g. via GenBank.

William Yancey Brown, when with the Brookings Institution, suggested that the Convention on Biological Diversity should include the preservation of intact genomes and viable cells for every known species and for new species as they are discovered.

Meetings of the Parties
A Conference of the Parties (COP) was held annually for three years after 1994, and thence biennially on even-numbered years.

1994 COP 1
The first ordinary meeting of the Parties to the Convention took place in November and December 1994, in Nassau, Bahamas.

1995 COP 2
The second ordinary meeting of the Parties to the Convention took place in November 1995, in Jakarta, Indonesia.

1996 COP 3
The third ordinary meeting of the Parties to the Convention took place in November 1996, in Buenos Aires, Argentina.

1998 COP 4
The fourth ordinary meeting of the Parties to the Convention took place in May 1998, in Bratislava, Slovakia.

1999 EX-COP 1 (Cartagena)
The First Extraordinary Meeting of the Conference of the Parties took place in February 1999, in Cartagena, Colombia. A series of meetings led to the adoption of the Cartagena Protocol on Biosafety in January 2000, effective from 2003.

2000 COP 5
The fifth ordinary meeting of the Parties to the Convention took place in May 2000, in Nairobi, Kenya.

2002 COP 6
The sixth ordinary meeting of the Parties to the Convention took place in April 2002, in The Hague, Netherlands.

2004 COP 7
The seventh ordinary meeting of the Parties to the Convention took place in February 2004, in Kuala Lumpur, Malaysia.

2006 COP 8
The eighth ordinary meeting of the Parties to the Convention took place in March 2006, in Curitiba, Brazil.

2008 COP 9
The ninth ordinary meeting of the Parties to the Convention took place in May 2008, in Bonn, Germany.

2010 COP 10 (Nagoya)

The tenth ordinary meeting of the Parties to the Convention took place in October 2010, in Nagoya, Japan. It was at this meeting that the Nagoya Protocol was ratified.

2010 was the International Year of Biodiversity and the Secretariat of the CBD was its focal point. Following a recommendation of CBD signatories during COP 10 at Nagoya, the UN, on 22 December 2010, declared 2011 to 2020 as the United Nations Decade on Biodiversity.

2012 COP 11

Leading up to the Conference of the Parties (COP 11) meeting on biodiversity in Hyderabad, India, 2012, preparations for a World Wide Views on Biodiversity has begun, involving old and new partners and building on the experiences from the World Wide Views on Global Warming.

2014 COP 12
Under the theme, "Biodiversity for Sustainable Development", thousands of representatives of governments, NGOs, indigenous peoples, scientists and the private sector gathered in Pyeongchang, Republic of Korea in October 2014 for the 12th meeting of the Conference of the Parties to the Convention on Biological Diversity (COP 12).

From 6–17 October 2014, Parties discussed the implementation of the Strategic Plan for Biodiversity 2011-2020 and its Aichi Biodiversity Targets, which are to be achieved by the end of this decade. The results of Global Biodiversity Outlook 4, the flagship assessment report of the CBD informed the discussions.

The conference gave a mid-term evaluation to the UN Decade on Biodiversity (2011–2020) initiative, which aims to promote the conservation and sustainable use of nature. The meeting achieved a total of 35 decisions, including a decision on "Mainstreaming gender considerations", to incorporate gender perspective to the analysis of biodiversity. 
 
At the end of the meeting, the meeting adopted the "Pyeongchang Road Map", which addresses ways to achieve biodiversity through technology cooperation, funding and strengthening the capacity of developing countries.

2016 COP 13

The thirteenth ordinary meeting of the Parties to the Convention took place between 2 and 17 December 2016 in Cancún, Mexico.

2018 COP 14
The 14th ordinary meeting of the Parties to the Convention took place on 17–29 November 2018, in Sharm El-Sheikh, Egypt. The 2018 UN Biodiversity Conference closed on 29 November 2018 with broad international agreement on reversing the global destruction of nature and biodiversity loss threatening all forms of life on Earth. Parties adopted the Voluntary Guidelines for the design and effective implementation of ecosystem-based approaches to climate change adaptation and disaster risk reduction. Governments also agreed to accelerate action to achieve the Aichi Biodiversity Targets, agreed in 2010, until 2020. Work to achieve these targets would take place at the global, regional, national and subnational levels.

2021/2022 COP 15

The 15th meeting of the Parties was originally scheduled to take place in Kunming, China in 2020, but was postponed several times due to the COVID-19 pandemic. After the start date was delayed for a third time, the Convention was split into two sessions. A mostly online event took place in October 2021, where over 100 nations signed the Kunming declaration on biodiversity. The theme of the declaration was "Ecological Civilization: Building a Shared Future for All Life on Earth". Twenty-one action-oriented draft targets were provisionally agreed in the October meeting, to be further discussed in the second session: an in-person event that was originally scheduled to start in April 2022, but was rescheduled to occur later in 2022. The second part of COP 15 ultimately took place in Montreal, Canada, from 5–17 December 2022. At the meeting, the Parties to the Convention adopted a new action plan, the Kunming-Montreal Global Biodiversity Framework.

2024 COP 16
The 16th meeting of the Parties is scheduled to be held in Turkey in 2024.

See also 

 2010 Biodiversity Indicators Partnership
 2010 Biodiversity Target
 30 by 30
 Agreement on Trade-Related Aspects of Intellectual Property Rights (TRIPs)
 Biodiversity banking
 Biological Diversity Act, 2002
 Biopiracy
 Bioprospecting
 Biosphere Reserve
 Convention on the Conservation of Migratory Species of Wild Animals
 Convention on the International Trade in Endangered Species of Wild Flora and Fauna
 Convention on Wetlands of International Importance, especially as Waterfowl Habitat
 Ecotourism
 Endangered species
 Endangered Species Recovery Plan
 Environmental agreements
 Environmental Modification Convention, another ban on weather modification / climate engineering.
 Globally Important Agricultural Heritage Systems (GIAHS)
 Green Development Initiative (GDI)
 Holocene extinction
 Intergovernmental Science-Policy Platform on Biodiversity and Ecosystem Services
 International Cooperative Biodiversity Groups
 International Organization for Biological Control
 International Treaty on Plant Genetic Resources for Food and Agriculture
 International Day for Biological Diversity
 International Year of Biodiversity
 Kunming-Montreal Global Biodiversity Framework
 Migratory Bird Treaty Act of 1918
 Red Data Book of Singapore
 Red Data Book of the Russian Federation
 Satoyama
 Sustainable forest management
 United Nations Convention to Combat Desertification
 United Nations Decade on Biodiversity
 United Nations Framework Convention on Climate Change
 World Conservation Monitoring Centre

References

This article is partly based on the relevant entry in the CIA World Factbook,  edition.

Further reading
Davis, K. 2008. A CBD manual for botanic gardens English version, Italian version Botanic Gardens Conservation International (BGCI)
There are indeed several comprehensive publications on the subject, the given reference covers only one small aspect

External links
 The Convention on Biological Diversity (CBD) website
 Text of the Convention from CBD website
Ratifications at depositary
 Case studies on the implementation of the Convention from BGCI website with links to relevant articles
 Introductory note by Laurence Boisson de Chazournes, procedural history note and audiovisual material on the Convention on Biological Diversity in the Historic Archives of the United Nations Audiovisual Library of International Law

 
C
Convention
United Nations treaties
Treaties concluded in 1992
Treaties entered into force in 1993
.Convention on Biodiversity
.Convention on Biodiversity
Convention on Biodiversity
Convention on Biodiversity
Convention on Biodiversity
Convention on Biodiversity
Animal treaties
Convention
Convention
Convention
Convention on Biodiversity
Convention on Biodiversity
Treaties entered into by the European Union
Treaties of the Afghan Transitional Administration
Treaties of Albania
Treaties of Algeria
Treaties of Andorra
Treaties of Angola
Treaties of Antigua and Barbuda
Treaties of Argentina
Treaties of Armenia
Treaties of Australia
Treaties of Austria
Treaties of Azerbaijan
Treaties of the Bahamas
Treaties of Bahrain
Treaties of Bangladesh
Treaties of Barbados
Treaties of Belarus
Treaties of Belgium
Treaties of Belize
Treaties of Benin
Treaties of Bhutan
Treaties of Bolivia
Treaties of Bosnia and Herzegovina
Treaties of Botswana
Treaties of Brazil
Convention on Biodiversity
Treaties of Brunei
Treaties of Bulgaria
Treaties of Burkina Faso
Treaties of Burundi
Treaties of Cambodia
Treaties of Cameroon
Treaties of Canada
Treaties of Cape Verde
Treaties of the Central African Republic
Treaties of Chad
Treaties of Chile
Treaties of the People's Republic of China
Treaties of Colombia
Treaties of the Comoros
Treaties of the Republic of the Congo
Treaties of the Cook Islands
Treaties of Costa Rica
Treaties of Ivory Coast
Treaties of Croatia
Treaties of Cuba
Treaties of Cyprus
Treaties of the Czech Republic
Treaties of North Korea
Treaties of Zaire
Treaties of Denmark
Treaties of Djibouti
Treaties of Dominica
Treaties of the Dominican Republic
Treaties of Ecuador
Treaties of Egypt
Treaties of El Salvador
Treaties of Equatorial Guinea
Treaties of Eritrea
Treaties of Estonia
Treaties of Eswatini
Treaties of the Transitional Government of Ethiopia
Treaties of Fiji
Treaties of Finland
Treaties of France
Treaties of Gabon
Treaties of the Gambia
Treaties of Georgia (country)
Treaties of Germany
Treaties of Ghana
Treaties of Greece
Treaties of Grenada
Treaties of Guatemala
Treaties of Guinea
Treaties of Guinea-Bissau
Treaties of Guyana
Treaties of Haiti
Treaties of Honduras
Treaties of Hungary
Treaties of Iceland
Treaties of India
Treaties of Indonesia
Treaties of Iran
Treaties of Iraq
Treaties of Ireland
Treaties of Israel
Treaties of Italy
Treaties of Jamaica
Treaties of Japan
Treaties of Jordan
Treaties of Kazakhstan
Treaties of Kenya
Treaties of Kiribati
Treaties of Kuwait
Treaties of Kyrgyzstan
Treaties of Laos
Treaties of Latvia
Treaties of Lebanon
Treaties of Lesotho
Treaties of Liberia
Treaties of the Libyan Arab Jamahiriya
Treaties of Liechtenstein
Treaties of Lithuania
Treaties of Luxembourg
Treaties of Madagascar
Treaties of Malawi
Treaties of Malaysia
Treaties of the Maldives
Treaties of Mali
Treaties of Malta
Treaties of the Marshall Islands
Treaties of Mauritania
Treaties of Mauritius
Treaties of Mexico
Treaties of the Federated States of Micronesia
Treaties of Moldova
Treaties of Monaco
Treaties of Mongolia
Treaties of Montenegro
Treaties of Morocco
Treaties of Mozambique
Treaties of Myanmar
Treaties of Namibia
Treaties of Nauru
Treaties of Nepal
Treaties of the Netherlands
Treaties of New Zealand
Treaties of Nicaragua
Treaties of Niger
Treaties of Nigeria
Treaties of Niue
Treaties of North Macedonia
Treaties of Norway
Treaties of Oman
Treaties of Pakistan
Treaties of Palau
Treaties of the State of Palestine
Treaties of Panama
Treaties of Papua New Guinea
Treaties of Paraguay
Treaties of Peru
Treaties of the Philippines
Treaties of Poland
Treaties of Portugal
Treaties of Qatar
Treaties of Romania
Treaties of Russia
Treaties of Rwanda
Treaties of Saint Kitts and Nevis
Treaties of Saint Lucia
Treaties of Saint Vincent and the Grenadines
Treaties of Samoa
Treaties of San Marino
Treaties of São Tomé and Príncipe
Treaties of Saudi Arabia
Treaties of Senegal
Treaties of Serbia and Montenegro
Treaties of Seychelles
Treaties of Sierra Leone
Treaties of Singapore
Treaties of Slovakia
Treaties of Slovenia
Treaties of the Solomon Islands
Treaties of the Transitional Federal Government of Somalia
Treaties of South Africa
Treaties of South Korea
Treaties of South Sudan
Treaties of Spain
Treaties of Sri Lanka
Treaties of the Republic of the Sudan (1985–2011)
Treaties of Suriname
Treaties of Sweden
Treaties of Switzerland
Treaties of Syria
Treaties of Tajikistan
Treaties of Thailand
Treaties of East Timor
Treaties of Togo
Treaties of Tonga
Treaties of Trinidad and Tobago
Treaties of Tunisia
Treaties of Turkey
Treaties of Turkmenistan
Treaties of Tuvalu
Treaties of Uganda
Treaties of Ukraine
Treaties of the United Arab Emirates
Treaties of the United Kingdom
Treaties of the United States
Treaties of Tanzania
Treaties of Uruguay
Treaties of Uzbekistan
Treaties of Vanuatu
Treaties of Venezuela
Treaties of Vietnam
Treaties of Yemen
Treaties of Zambia
Treaties of Zimbabwe
Treaties extended to Aruba
Treaties extended to the Netherlands Antilles
Treaties extended to Jersey
Treaties extended to the British Virgin Islands
Treaties extended to the Cayman Islands
Treaties extended to Gibraltar
Treaties extended to Saint Helena, Ascension and Tristan da Cunha
Treaties extended to the Isle of Man
Treaties extended to Greenland
Treaties extended to the Faroe Islands
Treaties extended to Portuguese Macau
Treaties extended to Hong Kong
Treaties extended to the Falkland Islands
Treaties extended to South Georgia and the South Sandwich Islands